Plectrochilus is a genus of pencil catfishes native to South America.

Species
There are currently three recognized species in this genus:
 Plectrochilus diabolicus (Myers, 1927)
 Plectrochilus machadoi (Miranda-Ribeiro, 1917)
 Plectrochilus wieneri (Pellegrin, 1909)

P. diabolicus and P. machadoi are found in the Amazon River basin in Brazil and Peru, while P. wieneri is found in the Napo River basin of Ecuador.

P. diabolicus grows to 4.8 centimetres (1.9 in) SL. P. machadoi grows to 9.3 cm (3.7 in).

Specimens of P. machadoi have been found partially buried in the belly of a specimen of Pseudoplatystoma where it apparently had burrowed through the body wall.

References

Trichomycteridae
Fish of South America
Fish of the Amazon basin
Fauna of Brazil
Fauna of Ecuador
Fauna of Peru
Catfish genera
Freshwater fish genera
Taxa named by Alípio de Miranda-Ribeiro